The Queen's Men can refer to any of three acting companies: 

Queen Elizabeth's Men 1583–94
Queen Anne's Men 1603–16
Queen Henrietta's Men 1625–36